O Come Little Children was recorded during the Mormon Tabernacle Choir's 2016 Christmas shows in the LDS Conference Center, featuring Rolando Villazón.  An album and concert DVD was released on October 7, 2017. The recorded concert premiered on PBS on December 15, 2017.

Track listing

References

2017 Christmas albums
Christmas albums by American artists
Tabernacle Choir albums